Verdun Cathedral is a Roman Catholic church located in the town of Verdun, Lorraine, France. The cathedral is the seat of the Bishops of Verdun. It was declared a monument historique on 30 October 1906 and the cloister on 13 July 1907.

History
In about 330, Saint Saintin (or Sainctinus) evangelised the city of Verdun, became its first bishop and founded a church dedicated to Saints Peter and Paul. In 457 Polychronius, a later bishop, had a cathedral built inside the walls of a ruined Roman building, on the present site.

Several buildings were erected and destroyed on this site, until in 990 Bishop Haimont ordered the construction of a new cathedral on the Romano-Rhenish plan: a nave, two transepts, two opposing apses, each one flanked by two belltowers.

In the 12th century, the architect Garin built the east choir, the two portals of Saint John and of the Lion, and the crypts. The building was consecrated by Pope Eugene III in 1147. The cloister seems also to have been built at about this time, close to a ravine.

In the 14th century, the cathedral was refurbished in the Renaissance style; the flat wooden ceiling was replaced by a vaulted one, the windows were enlarged, and the interior was decorated with frescos. The first rood screen was constructed and spires were added to the towers. Gothic side-chapels were added to either side of the lower end of the nave; the last side-chapel, dedicated to the Assumption, was built between 1522 and 1530. At about the same time the cloister was entirely rebuilt in the Flamboyant style, of which it is a spectacular example.

On 2 April 1755, the roof and towers were set on fire by a bolt of lightning; the spires were never replaced. The cathedral was badly damaged, and from 1760 was overhauled in the Neo-Classical style, of which the principal works are the refurbished nave, the east tower, the organs, and especially the magnificent Rococo baldacchino. The cathedral was pillaged in November 793.

The cathedral was severely damaged during World War I between 1916 and 1917; the eastern block was totally destroyed, and the towers have never been rebuilt. During the restoration that took place between 1920 and 1936, a number of Romanesque features were re-discovered, as well as the crypt. The cathedral was re-inaugurated in 1935. In July 1946 the cathedral was visited by Mgr Roncalli, the future Pope John XXIII.

The chthedral, the oldest in Lorraine, celebrated its millenium in 1990.

Notes and references

Sources

 Catholic Hierarchy: Diocese of Verdun
 Catholic Encyclopedia: Verdun
 Verdun Cathedral official website 

Roman Catholic cathedrals in France
Churches in Meuse (department)
Basilica churches in France